Batis (pronounced BAT-iss) is a genus of passerine birds in the wattle-eye family. Its species are resident in Africa south of the Sahara. They were previously classed as a subfamily of the Old World flycatcher family, Muscicapidae.

They are small stout insect-eating birds, usually found in open forests or bush. The nest is a small neat cup low in a tree or bush. They hunt by flycatching, or by taking prey from the ground like a shrike.

Batis species are strikingly patterned, typically with a grey crown, black eye mask, dark back, and paler underparts, often with a coloured or black breast band and white on the throat which contrasts strongly with the black eye stripe. Male and female plumages usually differ.

The song is typically a descending triple whistle.

Taxonomy
The genus Batis was introduced by the German zoologist Friedrich Boie in 1833. The type species was subsequently designated as the Cape batis. The name of the genus is from the Ancient Greek batis, batidos, an unidentified worm-eating bird mentioned by Aristotle.

The genus contains 21 species.

 Rwenzori batis, Batis diops
 Margaret's batis, Batis margaritae
 Forest batis, Batis mixta
 Reichenow's batis, Batis reichenowi
 Dark batis, Batis crypta
 Cape batis, Batis capensis
 Malawi batis, Batis dimoprha
 Woodwards's batis, Batis fratrum
 Chinspot batis, Batis molitor
 Senegal batis, Batis senegalensis
 Grey-headed batis, Batis orientalis
 Pale batis, Batis soror
 Pririt batis, Batis pririt
 Eastern black-headed batis, Batis minor
 Western black-headed batis, Batis erlangeri
 Pygmy batis, Batis perkeo
 Angola batis, Batis minulla
 Gabon batis, Batis minima
 Ituri batis, Batis ituriensis
West African batis, Batis occulta
 Fernando Po batis, Batis poensis

References

 

 
Platysteiridae
Bird genera